The 1940 New York Giants season was the franchise's 58th season. The team finished in sixth place in the National League with a 72–80 record, 37 games behind the Cincinnati Reds.

Offseason 
 December 6, 1939: Tom Hafey was purchased from the Giants by the Atlanta Crackers.

Regular season

Opening Day lineup

Season standings

Record vs. opponents

Notable transactions 
 June 15, 1940: Manny Salvo and Al Glossop were traded by the Giants to the Boston Bees for Tony Cuccinello.
 July 15, 1940: Willis Hudlin was signed as a free agent by the Giants.
 July 28, 1940: Willis Hudlin was released by the Giants.

Roster

Player stats

Batting

Starters by position 
Note: Pos = Position; G = Games played; AB = At bats; H = Hits; Avg. = Batting average; HR = Home runs; RBI = Runs batted in

Other batters 
Note: G = Games played; AB = At bats; H = Hits; Avg. = Batting average; HR = Home runs; RBI = Runs batted in

Pitching

Starting pitchers 
Note: G = Games pitched; IP = Innings pitched; W = Wins; L = Losses; ERA = Earned run average; SO = Strikeouts

Other pitchers 
Note: G = Games pitched; IP = Innings pitched; W = Wins; L = Losses; ERA = Earned run average; SO = Strikeouts

Relief pitchers 
Note: G = Games pitched; W = Wins; L = Losses; SV = Saves; ERA = Earned run average; SO = Strikeouts

Farm system

References

External links
 1940 New York Giants team page at Baseball Reference
 1940 New York Giants team page at Baseball Almanac

New York Giants (NL)
San Francisco Giants seasons
New York Giants season
New York
1940s in Manhattan
Washington Heights, Manhattan